Vanada is an unincorporated community in Anderson Township, Warrick County, in the U.S. state of Indiana.

History
Solomon Vanada built the first watermill in the county on nearby Cypress Creek in 1818.

Geography

References

Unincorporated communities in Warrick County, Indiana
Unincorporated communities in Indiana